The 1997–98 UEFA Champions League had two qualifying rounds to determine which 16 teams would play in the group stage, along with the eight teams that had qualified automatically. Teams from the higher-ranked UEFA nations received byes to the second qualifying round. Losing teams in the first qualifying round were eliminated from European competition for the season, while the losing teams from the second qualifying round were put into the draw for the first round of the 1997–98 UEFA Cup.

First qualifying round

|}

First leg

Second leg

Maribor won 3–0 on aggregate.

MTK Hungária won 6–3 on aggregate.

Dinamo Tbilisi won 8–2 on aggregate.

Košice won 4–0 on aggregate.

Croatia Zagreb won 5–1 on aggregate.

Skonto won 2-1 on aggregate.

Beitar Jerusalem won 3–1 on aggregate.

Steaua București won 5–3 on aggregate.

MPKC Mozyr won 4–3 on aggregate.

FC Jazz won 3–0 on aggregate.

Rangers won 11–0 on aggregate.

Widzew Łódź won 10-0 on aggregate.

Dynamo Kyiv won 6–0 on aggregate.

Sion won 5–0 on aggregate.

Anorthosis won 4–1 on aggregate.

Second qualifying round
Losing teams qualified for the first round of the 1997–98 UEFA Cup.

|}

Note: Winning teams of the first qualifying round were drawn against teams qualified directly for the second qualifying round. Because of the unequal number of teams (15 and 17), Wüstenrot Salzburg and Sparta Prague had to play against each other.

First leg

Note: The first match was abandoned after 68 minutes because the lights went out in the stadium. The leg was replayed from scratch a day later.

Match awarded because Paris Saint-Germain fielded an ineligible player.

Second leg

Beşiktaş won 3–1 on aggregate.

Rosenborg won 4–1 on aggregate.

Olympiacos won 7–2 on aggregate.

Sparta Praha won 3–0 on aggregate.

IFK Göteborg won 4–1 on aggregate.

Barcelona won 4–2 on aggregate.

Dynamo Kyiv won 4–3 on aggregate.

Newcastle United won 4–3 on aggregate.

Feyenoord won 8–3 on aggregate.

Bayer Leverkusen won 6–2 on aggregate.

Košice won 2–1 on aggregate.

Paris Saint-Germain won 5–3 on aggregate.

Parma won 7–1 on aggregate.

Sporting CP won 3–0 on aggregate.

External links
 First qualifying round
 Second qualifying round

Qualifying Rounds
1997-98